Playwrite is an EPUB-based desktop publishing application developed by Wundr. It runs on Mac OS X 10.8 (Mountain Lion) or later. Playwrite can import HTML and plain text files. Playwrite is the only desktop publishing software which uses EPUB as the native file type.

Features
Playwrite's has the following main features:

 Responsive e-books (design once, work on tablets, smartphones, and other devices)
 WYSIWYG editing
 Automatic table of contents (multi-level)
 Spelling and grammar checker (multi-language)
 Supports drag and drop of video, audio, and images
 Variety of templates in different genres (textbooks, novels, academic journals...)
 Font and color schemes to easily update the look and feel of your content
 Intuitive user-interface

References

External links
 

EPUB readers
MacOS text-related software
Typesetting software
Desktop publishing software
Software that uses Qt